Her Highness Dances the Waltz (German: Hoheit tanzt Walzer) is a 1926 Austrian silent romance film directed by Fritz Freisler and starring Claire Rommer, Magda Karmen and Walter Rilla. The operetta film is based on the 1912 operetta Hoheit tanzt Walzer by Leo Ascher (music) and Alfred Grünwald (libretto).

Cast
 Claire Rommer
 Magda Karmen
 Walter Rilla
 Eugen Neufeld
 
 Gisela Günther
 Lilian Gray
 Gyula Szőreghy
 Albert Paulig

See also
Her Highness Dances the Waltz (1935)

References

Bibliography
 Alfred Krautz. International Directory of Cinematographers, Set- and Costume Designers in Film, Volume 4. Saur, 1984.

External links

1926 films
1920s romance films
Austrian silent feature films
Austrian adventure films
Films directed by Fritz Freisler
Films based on operettas
Austrian black-and-white films
1926 adventure films
Silent adventure films